The  is Japan's authority for establishing transportation safety. It is a division of the Ministry of Land, Infrastructure, Transport and Tourism (MLIT).

The agency formed on October 1, 2008 as a merger between the Japan Marine Accident Inquiry Agency (JMAIA) and the Aircraft and Railway Accidents Investigation Commission (ARAIC).

Logo
In March 2012, the JTSB adopted a logo. The sphere represents the desire to carry out investigations of accidents and to maintain independence and fairness. The lines around the sphere represent the air, land, and sea. The blue-green color of the sphere represents safety.

Air accident investigations
 Japan Airlines Flight 123
 China Airlines Flight 120
 FedEx Express Flight 80
 Asiana Airlines Flight 162
 Korean Air Flight 2708

See also

 Japan Civil Aviation Bureau

References

External links
 Japan Transport Safety Board 
 Japan Transport Safety Board 

Transport Safety Board
Rail accident investigators
Organizations investigating aviation accidents and incidents
2008 establishments in Japan
Transport organizations based in Japan
Government agencies established in 2008